Anna Maria Picarelli (born November 4, 1984) is an American-born Italian former footballer who played as a goalkeeper for Seattle Sounders Women and the Italian national team.

Picarelli is an Italian American, born in Downey, California; her father Angelo Picarelli and uncle Joe Picarelli both became restaurateurs in Long Beach. Her paternal grandparents Mario and Maria Picarelli had migrated from Calabria to Downey in 1966.

As a senior in her successful four-year career playing varsity soccer at Pepperdine University, Picarelli was called into a training camp for the United States women's national under-23 soccer team. However, coach Jill Ellis quickly deemed Picarelli too small to be an effective goalkeeper at international level.

After graduating Picarelli approached Italian club Bardolino Verona who signed her after a very short trial. She played for Bardolino in a 3–3 UEFA Women's Champions League draw with Arsenal Ladies and caught the eye of Italy women's national football team manager Pietro Ghedin.

In January 2008 Picarelli made her debut for Italy in a 1–0 friendly defeat in France. By the time of UEFA Women's Euro 2009 Picarelli was Italy's first choice goalkeeper; playing in their shock 2–1 win over England, the 2–0 defeat to Sweden, the 2–1 over Russia and the quarter final defeat to eventual winners Germany.

After Italy's win over England, Picarelli's partner Cameron Thomas made her a marriage proposal inside the Lahti Stadium, which she accepted.

After leaving Bardolino and playing her club football in America, Picarelli continued to be selected by the Italian national team. She played against the country of her birth in the 2011 FIFA Women's World Cup qualification (UEFA–CONCACAF play-off), which Italy lost 2–0 on aggregate. She won a total of 42 caps for Italy.

In July 2014 she was appointed to a role as an assistant college soccer coach with the Simon Fraser Red Leafs, based in Burnaby, British Columbia, Canada.

References

External links
 Anna Maria Picarelli – UEFA profile

1984 births
Living people
Italian women's footballers
Italy women's international footballers
Pepperdine Waves women's soccer players
Sportspeople from Downey, California
American people of Italian descent
Soccer players from California
A.S.D. AGSM Verona F.C. players
Serie A (women's football) players
Women's association football goalkeepers
American women's soccer players
Damallsvenskan players
Kristianstads DFF players
Italian expatriate women's footballers
American expatriate women's soccer players
Italian expatriate sportspeople in Sweden
American expatriate sportspeople in Sweden
Expatriate women's footballers in Sweden
Ajax America Women players